Mike Pushkin is the Chair of the West Virginia Democratic Party and a Democratic member of the West Virginia House of Delegates representing District 37 since 2014. He is also a taxi driver and musician, taking passengers or playing as a guitarist for his band "600 Lbs of Sin!" when the legislature is not in session. Pushkin authored the original legislation to impeach the Justices of the Supreme Court of Appeals of West Virginia.

Early life and education
Pushkin's family arrived from Eastern Europe, most likely from Russia, in the late nineteenth century and settled in Charleston. Pushkin is the son of a doctor who worked at the Charleston Area Medical Center.

Pushkin started playing drums at the age of eight and switched to guitar at 13. He attended The Hill School for a year. He enrolled at West Virginia University and planned to attend law school. He left school before finishing and started using drugs, which accelerated into addiction after his father's death in 1993.

Career
In 2002, Pushkin moved from Morgantown to Charleston and started working as a taxi driver, but continued to fight his addiction and was fired. He was rehired after attaining sobriety, which he maintains.

Taxi driver
As a taxi driver, he sees a side of Charleston oblivious to many politicians and has been held at gunpoint. He sometimes serves as a designated driver for his legislative colleagues.

Musical
Pushkin is a member of the American Federation of Musicians Local 136. His current band is a five-member ensemble known as 600 Lbs of Sin! which takes its name from a Grateful Dead song. Many of his original songs are political in content, in response to coal mining or environmental issues. His most famous song is a reaction to the Upper Big Branch Mine disaster, a 2010 mine collapse. Pushkin taxied reporters to the site of the mine and was moved to sadness by the plight of miners. More recently, he has played in a new band, “Mike Pushkin and the Loyal Opposition”.

As a musician, he often covers the Grateful Dead and has played Country Roads at rallies.

Political
In 2014, Pushkin announced plans to run for Elections to West Virginia's 37th District after the incumbent launched a Congressional campaign. His campaign slogan was “I'll take YOU there” and used the hashtag #TaxiHippie. In 2016, he won a second term. Pushkin was endorsed by American Federation of Teachers, Communications Workers of America, UMWA, AFL–CIO, Teamsters, WVEA, United Electrical, Radio and Machine Workers of America, Carpenters, Operators and Engineers, Charleston Firefighters, and the Sierra Club.

Pushkin's legislative district, District 37 in the West Virginia House of Delegates, was the only legislative district in either chamber of the West Virginia State Legislature that supported Democratic nominee Hillary Clinton over Republican Donald Trump in the 2016 United States presidential election. In 2016, Clinton carried the state legislative district with 64.48 percent of the vote. Pushkin carried the same district with 75.2 percent of the vote in that year's general election, outrunning the Democratic presidential nominee by more than ten percentage points.

The West Virginia Democratic Party elected Mike Pushkin to be Chair of the party at their organizational meeting on June 18, 2022 in Bridgeport, West Virginia.

Legislation
Pushkin has developed a reputation for providing an independent voice on bills. He opposed the Religious Freedom Restoration Act, which gives businesses the right to decline to serve gay customers. In his first term, he introduced the Second Chance for Employment Act, which provides the opportunity for felons to have their records cleared after 10 years. He also unsuccessfully introduced a bill to legalize recreational marijuana during his first term. He reintroduced the Second Chance bill during his second term and the bill passed when a compromise was reached that would expunge misdemeanors, not felonies. He fought to successfully pass the West Virginia Medical Cannabis Act, thanks to support Pushkin secured from his Libertarian colleagues.

In 2018, Pushkin was a staunch proponent of the successful impeachment of the Supreme Court of West Virginia. Pushkin wrote the original resolution to initiate impeachment proceedings back in February. He was one of the first legislators to push for an investigation into Justice Loughry for his personal use of state property and the subsequent cover-up.  In 2018, Pushkin was a vocal supporter of the efforts to give teachers a pay raise and improve wages in the public sector.

Personal life
On September 3, 2004, he started attending Narcotics Anonymous and became sober, which he maintains to this day. He is married. Pushkin is the only Jewish member of the West Virginia legislature.

References

External links
Official page at the West Virginia Legislature
Campaign website

20th-century American Jews
21st-century American politicians
21st-century American Jews
American taxi drivers
Jewish American state legislators in West Virginia
Living people
Democratic Party members of the West Virginia House of Delegates
Politicians from Charleston, West Virginia
State political party chairs of West Virginia
The Hill School alumni
Year of birth missing (living people)